Alice Augusta Ball (July 25, 1892 – December 31, 1916) was an American chemist who developed the "Ball Method", the most effective treatment for leprosy during the early 20th century. She was the first woman and first African American to receive a master's degree from the University of Hawaiʻi, and was also the university's first female and African American chemistry professor. She died at age 24 and her contributions to science were not recognized until many years after her death.

Early life and education
Alice Augusta Ball was born on July 24, 1892, in Seattle, Washington, to James Presley and Laura Louise (Howard) Ball. She was one of four children, with two older brothers, William and Robert, and a younger sister, Addie. Her family was middle-class and well off, as Ball's father was a newspaper editor of The Colored Citizen, photographer, and lawyer. Her mother also worked as a photographer. Her grandfather, James Ball Sr., was a photographer, and one of the first Black Americans to make use of daguerreotype, the process of printing photographs onto metal plates. Some researchers have suggested that her parents' and grandfather's love for photography may have played a role in her love for chemistry, as they worked with mercury vapors and iodine sensitized silver plates to develop photos. Despite being prominent members and advocates of the African American community, both of Ball's parents are listed as "White" on her birth certificate. This may have been an attempt to reduce the prejudice and racism their daughter would face and help her "pass" in white society.

Alice Ball and her family moved from Seattle to Honolulu in 1903 in hopes that the warm weather would relieve her grandfather's arthritis. He died shortly after the move and in 1905 they relocated back to Seattle after only a year in Hawaii. After returning to Seattle, Ball attended Seattle High School and achieved top grades in the sciences. She graduated from Seattle High School in 1910.

Ball went on to study chemistry at the University of Washington, earning a bachelor's degree in pharmaceutical chemistry in 1912 and a second bachelor's degree in the science of pharmacy two years later in 1914. Alongside her pharmacy instructor, Williams Dehn, she published a 10-page article, "Benzoylations in Ether Solution", in the Journal of the American Chemical Society. Publishing an article in a respected scientific journal was an uncommon accomplishment for a woman and especially for a Black woman at this time.

After graduating, Ball was offered many scholarships. She received an offer from the University of California Berkeley, as well as the College of Hawaii (now the University of Hawaiʻi), where she decided to study for a master's degree in chemistry. At the College of Hawaii, her master's thesis involved studying the chemical properties of the Kava plant species. Because of this research and her understanding of the chemical makeup of plants, she was later approached by Harry T. Hollmann, who was an Acting Assistant Surgeon at the Leprosy Investigation Station of the U. S. Public Health Service in Hawaii, to study chaulmoogra oil and its chemical properties. Chaulmoogra oil had been the best treatment available for leprosy for hundreds of years, and Ball developed a much more effective injectable form. In 1915 she became the first woman and first Black American to graduate with a master's degree from the College of Hawaii. She was also the first African American "research chemist and instructor" in the College of Hawaii's chemistry department.

Treatment for leprosy
At the University of Hawaiʻi, Ball investigated the chemical makeup and active principle of Piper methysticum (kava) for her master's thesis. Because of this work, she was contacted by Dr. Harry T. Hollmann at Kalihi Hospital in Hawaii, who needed an assistant for his research into the treatment of leprosy.

At the time, leprosy or Hansen's Disease was a highly stigmatized disease with virtually no chance of recovery. People diagnosed with leprosy were exiled to the Hawaiian island of Molokai with the expectation that they would die there. The best treatment available was chaulmoogra oil, from the seeds of the Hydnocarpus wightianus tree from the Indian subcontinent, which had been used medicinally from as early as the 1300s. But the treatment was not very effective, and every method of application had problems. It was too sticky to be effectively used topically, and as an injection the oil's viscous consistency caused it to clump under the skin and form blisters rather than being absorbed. These blisters formed in perfect rows and made it look "as if the patient's skin had been replaced by bubble wrap". Ingesting the oil was not effective either because it had an acrid taste that usually made patients vomit it up.

At age 23, Ball developed a technique to make the oil injectable and absorbable by the body. Her technique involved isolating ester compounds from the oil and chemically modifying them, producing a substance that retained the oil's therapeutic properties and was absorbed by the body when injected. Ball was unable to publish her revolutionary findings before her untimely death. Arthur L. Dean, a chemist and Ball's graduate study advisor, dean of the college, and later president of the university, was privy to details of the process she developed. After Ball's death, Dean undertook further trials and by 1919, a college chemistry laboratory was producing large quantities of the injectable chaulmoogra extract. Dean published details of the work and the findings without acknowledging Ball as the originator, or crediting her work. Her name is not mentioned in any of Dean's published works on the chaulmoogra extract, while the name "the Dean method" is appended to the technique. A University of Hawai'i academic, Paul Wermager, in 2004, quoted a 1921 newspaper interview with Dean, in which he emphasizes the importance of the work of his predecessors in the development of the extract. Despite this, according to Wermager, the Paradise of the Pacific report goes on to mention Hollmann and other colleagues, but not Ball.

In 1920, a Hawaii physician reported in the Journal of the American Medical Association that 78 patients had been discharged from Kalihi Hospital by the board of health examiners after treatment with injections of Ball's modified chaulmoogra oil. In Ball's Method, ethyl esters of the fatty acids found in chaulmoogra oil were prepared into a form suitable for injection and absorption into the circulation. While not curative or able to fully halt the disease's progress indefinitely, the isolated ethyl ester remained the only available, effective treatment for leprosy until sulfonamide drugs were developed in the 1940s.

Ball's colleague Hollmann attempted to correct the mistaken impression of the extract's development. He published a paper in 1922 giving credit to Ball, calling the injectable form of the oil the "Ball method" throughout the article. Hollmann discusses techniques developed elsewhere and reports progress in related leprosy treatments. Although Dean had contended that his later work was a refinement of Ball's method, producing an "advanced specific", Hollmann compares Dean's and Ball's techniques in the article, in a section titled "Ball's Method of Making Ethyl Esters of the Fatty Acids of Chaulmoogra Oil", and rejects this. He describes Dean's method and writes of it: 
Ball nevertheless remained largely forgotten in the scientific record. In the 1970s, Kathryn Takara and Stanley Ali, professors at the University of Hawaiʻi, found records of Ball's research and made efforts to ensure her achievement was recognized.

Death and recognition
Ball died on December 31, 1916, at age 24. She had become ill during her research and returned to Seattle for treatment a few months before her death. A 1917 Pacific Commercial Advertiser article suggested that the cause may have been chlorine poisoning due to exposure while teaching in the laboratory. It was reported that she was giving a demonstration on how to properly use a gas mask in preparation for an attack, as World War I was raging in Europe. But the cause of her death is unknown, as her original death certificate was altered to cite tuberculosis.

The first recognition of Ball's work came six years after her death when, in 1922, she was briefly mentioned in a medical journal, with her method being called the "Ball Method". After the work of many historians at the University of Hawaiʻi including Kathryn Takara and Stanley Ali, the University of Hawaiʻi finally honored Ball in 2000 by dedicating a plaque to her on the school's only chaulmoogra tree behind Bachman Hall. On the same day, the former Lieutenant Governor of Hawaii, Mazie Hirono, declared February 29 "Alice Ball Day," which is now celebrated every four years. In 2007, the University Board of Regents honored Ball with a Medal of Distinction, the school's highest honor. In March 2016, Hawaiʻi Magazine placed Ball on its list of the most influential women in Hawaiian history. In 2018, a new park in Seattle's Greenwood neighborhood was named after Ball. In 2019, the London School of Hygiene and Tropical Medicine added her name to the frieze atop its main building, along with Florence Nightingale and Marie Curie, in recognition of their contributions to science and global health research. In February 2020, a short film, The Ball Method will premiere at the Pan African Film Festival. University of Hawaiʻi students have asked whether more should be done to resolve the wrongful actions of former President Dean, including proposals to rename Dean Hall after Ball instead. On November 6, 2020, a satellite named after her (ÑuSat 9 or "Alice", COSPAR 2020-079A) was launched into space.

On February 28, 2022, Hawaii Governor David Ige signed a proclamation declaring February 28 "Alice Augusta Ball Day" in Hawaii at a special recognition ceremony on the University of Hawaiʻi at Mānoa campus. The ceremony took place next to Bachman Hall in the shade of a Chaulmoogra tree planted in Ball’s honor. A bronze plaque is displayed there in her memory. More than 100 people attended, including First Lady Dawn Ige and UH President David Lassner.

See also
List of African-American inventors and scientists
Beebe Steven Lynk

References

External links
Episode 7: Alice Ball from Babes of Science podcasts
Meet Alice Ball, Unsung Pioneer In Leprosy Treatment from Science Friday broadcast
Featured in Women Untold video from Lawrence Technical University on three women of color in STEM (Ball is discussed from 12:14 to 20:45)

1892 births
1916 deaths
20th-century American chemists
20th-century American women scientists
20th-century African-American women
20th-century African-American scientists
American pharmacists
American women chemists
Scientists from Seattle
University of Hawaiʻi at Mānoa alumni
University of Washington School of Pharmacy alumni
University of Washington College of Arts and Sciences alumni
Women pharmacists
Inventors from Washington (state)